Oleg Asadulin (born October 5, 1971) is a Russian film director, screenwriter and producer.

Biography
Oleg was born in Chelyabinsk. There he studied at an art school, and at the age of 19 he went to St. Petersburg, where he entered the Mukhinsky school. In the 90s, Oleg moved to Germany and worked there as an artist, he built sets for various films. There, in Germany, Oleg received a director's education. Namely at the Deutsche Film- und Fernsehakademie Berlin. In the 2000s, he returned to Russia, where he directed films and TV series.

Filmography (selected)
 The Phobos (2010)
 Green Carriage (2015)
 The Route Is Calculated (2016)
 Deadly Illusions (2020)

References

External links 
 
 Oleg Asadulin on kino-teatr.ru

Living people
Russian film directors
1971 births